Cangetta cervinalis is a moth in the family Crambidae. It was described by Aristide Caradja and Edward Meyrick in 1934. It is found in China and the Russian Far East.

References

Moths described in 1934
Spilomelinae